"Sneakin' is a song by Canadian rapper Drake featuring rapper 21 Savage. The song was released for digital download on October 29, 2016, through Young Money Entertainment, Cash Money Records and Republic Records. "Sneakin is one of three singles that Drake released simultaneously, alongside "Fake Love" and "Two Birds, One Stone". The track is produced by London on da Track who also assisted the artists in writing the song.

Composition
"Sneakin is a hip hop song with bounce influences composed in common time ( time) and produced in Ab Major with a tempo of 85 beats per minute. The song was produced by London on da Track using Ableton Live. Entertainment Weekly highlighted the song's Atlanta hip hop influence, calling it a "lurching ode to [Drake's] haters".

Music video
The music video, which was directed by GAB3, was released on November 13, 2016, exclusively on Apple Music.

Critical reception
Entertainment Weekly gave the song, along with "Fake Love" and "Two Birds, One Stone" a grade of B+, and commended its "vivid, open-book lyricism".

Personnel 
All credited as songwriters. Adapted from TIDAL.

 London on da Track – producer
 Drake – vocals
 21 Savage – vocals

Charts

Weekly charts

Year-end charts

Certifications and sales

References

2016 singles
2016 songs
Cash Money Records singles
Drake (musician) songs
Island Records singles
Songs written by Drake (musician)
Universal Music Group singles
Young Money Entertainment singles
Songs written by 21 Savage
Songs written by London on da Track
Song recordings produced by London on da Track